Altro is an album by Italian singer Mina distributed back to back with album Dalla Bussola. Altro is the first in her series of double albums.

Track listing

Arrangers-conductors 

Alberto Baldan: Non ti riconosco più
Pino Presti: I giorni dei falò (Long Ago And Far Away), Volendo si può, Fate piano 
Natale Massara: Ballata d'autunno (Balada de otoño), Amore mio, Ossessione '70
Giulio Libano: L'amore, forse... (Ao amigo Tom), 
Massimo Salerno: Rudy, L'abitudine (Daddy's dream)

Sound engineer: Nuccio Rinaldis.

External links 

 Discography at Discogs

1972 albums
Mina (Italian singer) albums
Albums conducted by Pino Presti
Albums arranged by Pino Presti
Italian-language albums